Vasiti Solikoviti (born 2 August 1993) is a Fijian rugby sevens player. She competed in the women's tournament at the 2020 Summer Olympics and won a bronze medal at the event.

Solikoviti was part of the Fijiana sevens team that won the silver medal at the 2022 Commonwealth Games in Birmingham. She later featured at the 2022 Rugby World Cup Sevens in Cape Town.

References

External links

1993 births
Living people
Female rugby sevens players
Olympic rugby sevens players of Fiji
Rugby sevens players at the 2020 Summer Olympics
Medalists at the 2020 Summer Olympics
Olympic bronze medalists for Fiji
Olympic medalists in rugby sevens
Place of birth missing (living people)
Fiji international women's rugby sevens players
Rugby sevens players at the 2022 Commonwealth Games
Commonwealth Games silver medallists for Fiji
Commonwealth Games medallists in rugby sevens
Medallists at the 2022 Commonwealth Games